Hazlet is a township in Monmouth County, New Jersey, United States. The township is located near the Raritan Bay within the Raritan Valley region. It is located in the New York Metropolitan Area and is a bedroom community of New York City. As of the 2020 United States census, the township's population was 20,125, a decrease of 209 (−1.0%) from the 2010 census count of 20,334, which in turn reflected a decline of 1,044 (−4.9%) from the 21,378 counted in the 2000 census.

Hazlet is part of the Bayshore Regional Strategic Plan, an effort by nine municipalities in northern Monmouth County to reinvigorate the area's economy by emphasizing the traditional downtowns, dense residential neighborhoods, maritime history, and the natural environment of the Raritan Bayshore coastline.

History 
What is now Hazlet Township was originally incorporated as Raritan Township by an act of the New Jersey Legislature on February 25, 1848, from portions of Middletown Township. Portions of the township were taken to form Holmdel Township (February 23, 1857), Matawan Township (also February 23, 1857, now Aberdeen Township), Keyport (March 17, 1870), Keansburg (March 26, 1917) and Union Beach (March 16, 1925). The township was renamed "Hazlet Township" as of November 28, 1967, based on the results of a referendum held on November 7, 1967. Hazlet derives its name from Dr. John Hazlett, who had an estate in Raritan Township near the Keyport-Holmdel Turnpike, now Holmdel Road.

Hazlet was the site of the last drive-in movie theater in New Jersey, the Route 35 Drive-In, which closed in 1991, until the Delsea Drive-In in Vineland reopened in 2004.

Geography 
According to the United States Census Bureau, the township had a total area of 5.67 square miles (14.68 km2), including 5.57 square miles (14.42 km2) of land and 0.10 square miles (0.26 km2) of water (1.76%).

Unincorporated communities located partially or completely within Hazlet include Centerville, Mechanicsville, North Centerville, South Keyport, Tiltons Corner, Van Marters Corner and West Keansburg.

The township borders Aberdeen Township, Holmdel Township, Keansburg, Keyport, Middletown Township and Union Beach.

Demographics

2010 census

The Census Bureau's 2006–2010 American Community Survey showed that (in 2010 inflation-adjusted dollars) median household income was $89,415 (with a margin of error of +/− $5,891) and the median family income was $102,743 (+/− $5,511). Males had a median income of $71,710 (+/− $5,920) versus $53,371 (+/− $2,532) for females. The per capita income for the township was $33,051 (+/− $1,340). About 1.2% of families and 2.5% of the population were below the poverty line, including 1.3% of those under age 18 and 6.0% of those age 65 or over.

2000 census
As of the 2000 United States census there were 21,378 people, 7,244 households, and 5,802 families residing in the township. The population density was 3,802.3 people per square mile (1,468.7/km2). There were 7,406 housing units at an average density of 1,317.2 per square mile (508.8/km2). The racial makeup of the township was 93.17% White, 1.10% African American, 0.06% Native American, 3.39% Asian, 1.13% from other races, and 1.15% from two or more races. Hispanic or Latino of any race were 5.87% of the population.

There were 7,244 households, out of which 37.2% had children under the age of 18 living with them, 67.2% were married couples living together, 9.4% had a female householder with no husband present, and 19.9% were non-families. 17.3% of all households were made up of individuals, and 9.7% had someone living alone who was 65 years of age or older. The average household size was 2.92 and the average family size was 3.32.

In the township the population was spread out, with 25.5% under the age of 18, 6.9% from 18 to 24, 29.2% from 25 to 44, 25.0% from 45 to 64, and 13.5% who were 65 years of age or older. The median age was 38 years. For every 100 females, there were 91.5 males. For every 100 females age 18 and over, there were 89.1 males.

The median income for a household in the township was $65,697, and the median income for a family was $71,361. Males had a median income of $51,776 versus $32,439 for females. The per capita income for the township was $25,262. About 2.3% of families and 3.4% of the population were below the poverty line, including 2.6% of those under age 18 and 6.6% of those age 65 or over.

Government

Local government 
Hazlet is governed under the Township form of New Jersey municipal government, one of 141 municipalities (of the 564) statewide that use this form, the second-most commonly used form of government in the state. The Township Committee is comprised of five members, who are elected directly by the voters at-large in partisan elections to serve three-year terms of office on a staggered basis, with either one or two seats coming up for election each year as part of the November general election in a three-year cycle. The Mayor and Deputy Mayor are elected annually by the Committee from among its five members at a reorganization meeting held each January.

, members of the Hazlet Township Committee are Mayor Michael Sachs (R, term on committee ends December 31, 2023; term as mayor ends 2023), Deputy Mayor Peter Terranova (R, elected to unexpired term on committee ending 2024; term as deputy mayor ends 2023), James A. Cavuto (R, 2025), Michael Glackin (R, 2023; elected to serve an unexpired term) and Robert Preston Jr. (R, 2025).

In April 2022, the Township Committee selected Peter Terranova to fill the seat expiring in December 2024 that had been held by Tara Corcoran-Clark until she stepped down from office in February due to health issues. In May 2022, Robert Preston was appointed to the seat that had been held by Scott Aagre until resigned from office the previous month from a seat expiring in December 2022.

In January 2019, former councilmember Michael Sachs was selected to fill the council seat expiring in December 2020 that had been held by Susan Kiley until she resigned to take office on the Monmouth County Board of chosen freeholders. Sachs served on an interim basis until the November 2019 general election, when he was chosen to serve the balance of the term of office.

Federal, state and county representation 
Hazlet Township is located in the 6th Congressional District and is part of New Jersey's 13th state legislative district.

 

Monmouth County is governed by a Board of County Commissioners comprised of five members who are elected at-large to serve three year terms of office on a staggered basis, with either one or two seats up for election each year as part of the November general election. At an annual reorganization meeting held in the beginning of January, the board selects one of its members to serve as director and another as deputy director. , Monmouth County's Commissioners are
Commissioner Director Thomas A. Arnone (R, Neptune City, term as commissioner and as director ends December 31, 2022), 
Commissioner Deputy Director Susan M. Kiley (R, Hazlet Township, term as commissioner ends December 31, 2024; term as deputy commissioner director ends 2022),
Lillian G. Burry (R, Colts Neck Township, 2023),
Nick DiRocco (R, Wall Township, 2022), and 
Ross F. Licitra (R, Marlboro Township, 2023). 
Constitutional officers elected on a countywide basis are
County clerk Christine Giordano Hanlon (R, 2025; Ocean Township), 
Sheriff Shaun Golden (R, 2022; Howell Township) and 
Surrogate Rosemarie D. Peters (R, 2026; Middletown Township).

Politics
As of March 2011, there were a total of 13,685 registered voters in Hazlet Township, of which 3,679 (26.9%) were registered as Democrats, 2,606 (19.0%) were registered as Republicans and 7,388 (54.0%) were registered as Unaffiliated. There were 12 voters registered as Libertarians or Greens.

In the 2012 presidential election, Republican Mitt Romney received 51.8% of the vote (4,844 cast), ahead of Democrat Barack Obama with 46.6% (4,365 votes), and other candidates with 1.6% (148 votes), among the 9,430 ballots cast by the township's 13,851 registered voters (73 ballots were spoiled), for a turnout of 68.1%. In the 2008 presidential election, Republican John McCain received 54.0% of the vote (5,732 cast), ahead of Democrat Barack Obama with 43.5% (4,618 votes) and other candidates with 1.3% (139 votes), among the 10,617 ballots cast by the township's 14,345 registered voters, for a turnout of 74.0%. In the 2004 presidential election, Republican George W. Bush received 56.2% of the vote (5,756 ballots cast), outpolling Democrat John Kerry with 42.7% (4,375 votes) and other candidates with 0.6% (86 votes), among the 10,249 ballots cast by the township's 13,777 registered voters, for a turnout percentage of 74.4.

In the 2013 gubernatorial election, Republican Chris Christie received 72.0% of the vote (4,164 cast), ahead of Democrat Barbara Buono with 26.3% (1,524 votes), and other candidates with 1.7% (97 votes), among the 5,883 ballots cast by the township's 13,838 registered voters (98 ballots were spoiled), for a turnout of 42.5%. In the 2009 gubernatorial election, Republican Chris Christie received 65.7% of the vote (4,517 ballots cast), ahead of Democrat Jon Corzine with 26.2% (1,805 votes), Independent Chris Daggett with 6.1% (420 votes) and other candidates with 1.3% (87 votes), among the 6,877 ballots cast by the township's 13,927 registered voters, yielding a 49.4% turnout.

Education 
The Hazlet Township Public Schools serve students in pre-kindergarten through twelfth grade. As of the 2018–19 school year, the district, comprised of eight schools, had an enrollment of 2,871 students and 254.1 classroom teachers (on an FTE basis), for a student–teacher ratio of 11.3:1. Schools in the district (with 2018–19 enrollment data from the National Center for Education Statistics) are 
Sycamore Drive Early Childhood Learning Center (295 students; in Pre-K–K), 
Lillian Drive Elementary School (252; 1–4), 
Middle Road Elementary School (277; 1–4), 
Raritan Valley Elementary School (243; 1–4), 
Beers Street Elementary School (225; 5–6),
Cove Road Elementary School (178; 5–6), 
Hazlet Middle School (451; 7–8) and 
Raritan High School (922; 9–12).

Transportation

Roads and highways

Route 35, Route 36 and County Route 516 are within Hazlet Township's borders. The Garden State Parkway also travels through the township, providing easy access to the Jersey Shore and destinations south and to New York City and destinations north. The Parkway's interchange 117, labeled for Keyport / Hazlet, is located within the township.

Public transportation

NJ Transit service is available at the Hazlet station. offering travel on the North Jersey Coast Line to Hoboken Terminal, Newark Penn Station and New York Penn Station in Midtown Manhattan.

NJ Transit provides local bus service on the 817 route.

Through rail freight service is provided by Conrail Shared Assets Operations, which provides freight service between South Amboy and Lakehurst via Red Bank.

Cemeteries
The Aumack Family Burying Ground contains the graves of 20 people, including War of 1812 Private Garret Aumack and War of 1812 Corporal Leonard Aumack.

Notable people 

People who were born in, residents of, or otherwise closely associated with Hazlet include:
 David Burke (born 1962), chef and restaurateur
 James Coonan (born 1946), former head of the Irish-American gang The Westies
 Ray Evernham (born 1957), NASCAR co-owner of Evernham Motorsports and former crew chief of Jeff Gordon
 Jeff Feuerzeig (born 1964), film screenwriter and director
 Sammi "Sweetheart" Giancola (born 1987), television personality, model and actress who appeared on MTV's Jersey Shore
 Doug Hamilton (1963–2006), Major League Soccer executive
 Bennett Jackson (born 1991), cornerback for the New York Giants who attended the University of Notre Dame
 Joey Janela (born 1989), professional wrestler with All Elite Wrestling
 Daniel O'Brien (born 1986), editor and senior writer for the comedy website Cracked.com
 Skip O'Brien (1950–2011), actor who had a recurring role on CSI: Crime Scene Investigation
 Jim Ortlieb (born 1956), film, television and theatre actor known for his roles in Roswell and Felicity
 Jerry Recco (born 1974), WFAN sports anchor
 Denise Reddy (born 1970), former professional soccer player who has been head coach of Sky Blue FC in the National Women's Soccer League since November 2017
 Michael A. Sheehan (1955–2018), author, government official and military officer
 Dave Witte (born 1971), heavy metal drummer known for his work with Municipal Waste, Discordance Axis, Black Army Jacket, Birds of Prey, and Burnt By The Sun

References

External links

 Hazlet Township official website

 
1848 establishments in New Jersey
Populated places established in 1848
Raritan Bayshore
Township form of New Jersey government
Townships in Monmouth County, New Jersey